Park Jin-hwan (born 15 July 1987) is a former South Korean short-track speedskater. He is the 2009 World Team champion. During the 2008–09 World Cup season, he achieved one relay victory, another two relay podiums as well as one personal podium.

He participated in the 2009 World Championships in Vienna, Austria. In the men's relay, Korean team finished just 6th.

World Cup podiums

References

External links
 Park Jin-hwan's profile at shorttrackonline.info

South Korean male short track speed skaters
1987 births
Living people
21st-century South Korean people
Dankook University alumni